Chet Pickard (born November 29, 1989) is a Canadian-German former professional ice hockey goaltender. He most notably played in the American Hockey League and the Deutsche Eishockey Liga (DEL). He holds a German passport.

Playing career
Pickard played minor hockey with the Winnipeg Monarchs before joining the major junior ranks with the Tri-City Americans of the Western Hockey League (WHL) in 2005–06. He played backup to Carey Price in his first two seasons, then took over the starting position in 2007–08 as Price graduated to the Montreal Canadiens. Pickard won 46 games, was named CHL Goaltender of the Week on December 9, 2008., and posted a 2.32 goals against average (GAA) and .920 save percentage, en route to succeeding Price as CHL Goaltender of the Year. He was additionally awarded the Del Wilson Trophy as the top WHL goaltender and was named to the WHL West and CHL First All-Star Teams. 

In the off-season, he was drafted by the Nashville Predators in the first round, 18th overall, in the 2008 NHL Entry Draft. In 2008–09, he recorded a 2.28 GAA and .921 save percentage, while helping lead the Americans to their second straight U.S. Division title. He was nominated for his second Del Wilson Trophy opposite Braden Holtby of the Saskatoon Blades and named to the WHL West First All-Star Team.

Pickard played most of the 2010–11 season with the Cincinnati Cyclones of the ECHL and Milwaukee Admirals of the AHL. During the 2011 Stanley Cup playoffs he was called up to the Nashville Predators before their 2nd round series with the Vancouver Canucks; however, he did not get into a game.

In the 2012–13 season, Pickard signed his first contract abroad in agreeing to a one-year deal with Swedish HockeyAllsvenskan side, Djurgårdens IF. In 45 games, Pickard earned a professional high 25 wins to help Djurgårdens advance to the Kvalserien playoffs.

Pickard returned to North America in the off-season and agreed to a try-out at the San Antonio Rampage training camp for the 2013–14 season. He was later released by the Rampage before on November 8, 2013, he was signed to an AHL deal with the Oklahoma City Barons and then loaned to the Bakersfield Condors of the ECHL.

On June 10, 2014, Pickard returned for another stint in Europe, signing a one-year contract to be the starting goaltender with Danish club, the Odense Bulldogs of the Metal Ligaen. At the starting goaltender with the Bulldogs, Pickard enjoyed a successful season in appearing in 36 games.

On May 22, 2015, Pickard left Denmark to sign an optional two-year deal with German club, Iserlohn Roosters of the DEL. He was slated to begin as backup to starting goaltender Mathias Lange.  In the 2016–17 season with the Roosters, Pickard appeared in 26 games with the Roosters, posting just 6 wins as Iserlohn finished out of playoff contention. On March 3, 2017, it was announced that Pickard opted for a new opportunity and would not re-new his contract.

On April 28, 2017, Pickard decided to continue in the DEL, agreeing to a two-year contract to assume the backup duties with Adler Mannheim.

After claiming the DEL Championship in his final season under contract with Mannheim in 2018–19, Pickard left as a free agent to sign a two-year contract with Grizzlys Wolfsburg on May 2, 2019.

Following his third year with Grizzlys Wolfsburg in 2021–22 season, and despite being under contract, Pickard ended his 13-year professional career by announcing his retirement on July 26, 2022.

Personal
Chet was born in Moncton, New Brunswick and moved to Winnipeg, Manitoba when he was eleven.

Chet's younger brother Calvin Pickard is also a professional goaltender, playing for the Detroit Red Wings of the National Hockey League. Chet is married to Meghan Corbett. Meghan gave birth to their first child in October 2016.

International play

Playing in his fourth junior season, Pickard was selected by Team Canada for the 2009 World Junior Championships. He played in two games as backup to Dustin Tokarski of the Spokane Chiefs, helping Canada to their fifth straight gold medal.

Career statistics

Regular season and playoffs

International

Awards and honours

References

External links

1989 births
Living people
Adler Mannheim players
Bakersfield Condors (1998–2015) players
Canadian ice hockey goaltenders
Cincinnati Cyclones (ECHL) players
Djurgårdens IF Hockey players
Canadian expatriate ice hockey players in Sweden
Grizzlys Wolfsburg players
Ice hockey people from New Brunswick
Iserlohn Roosters players
Milwaukee Admirals players
Nashville Predators draft picks
National Hockey League first-round draft picks
Odense Bulldogs players
Oklahoma City Barons players
Sportspeople from Moncton